The Juno Award for Traditional R&B/Soul Recording of the Year is an annual Canadian music award, presented as part of the Juno Awards to honour the year's best Canadian recordings in traditional rhythm and blues and soul music. The award was presented for the first time at the Juno Awards of 2021, after the splitting of the former R&B/Soul Recording of the Year into new categories for contemporary and traditional music.

Winners and nominees

References 

Traditional RandB Soul Recording